Suflí is a municipality of Almería province, in the autonomous community of Andalusia, Spain. Suflí is known for a product of tomatoes and peppers that's roasted and bottled in a nearby factory called fritá.

Demographics

References

External links
  Suflí - Sistema de Información Multiterritorial de Andalucía
  Suflí - Diputación Provincial de Almería

Municipalities in the Province of Almería